Sarjoo Pandey (19 November 1919 (Urha) - 25 August 1989, Moscow) was an Indian politician, Indian independence activist and a leader of the Communist Party of India.

Life
Pandey was born in Urha (small village  in Kasimabad) on 19 November 1919 in the family of a Brahmin farmer Mahaveer Pandey. He was in the 8th standard when he joined the Indian independence movement. He was ordered to be shot on sight for his activities against the British rule.. A number of sections of the Indian Penal Code were leveled against him. He was the only independence activist from Ghazipur who accepted the charges in the court and sought punishment from the court.

Pandey was a member of the 2nd, 3rd, 4th and 5th Lok Sabha. He was elected to the 2nd and 3rd Lok Sabha from Rasra constituency in 1957 and 1962 and to the 4th and 5th Lok Sabha from Ghazipur constituency in 1967 and 1971. When he was elected to the Lok Sabha, Jawaharlal Nehru in the Parliamnent presented him a rose, which he then carried in his coat.

Position held
Vice-President, All India Kisan Sabha
General Secretary, All India Cane Growers' Association
Member, National Council of Communist Party of India
Deputy Leader, Communist Party of India group in Lok Sabha
Second Lok Sabha, 1957–62
Third Lok Sabha, 1962–67 
Fourth Lok Sabha, 1967–70

References

People from Ghazipur
India MPs 1957–1962
India MPs 1962–1967
India MPs 1967–1970
India MPs 1971–1977
1989 deaths
1919 births
Communist Party of India politicians from Uttar Pradesh
Lok Sabha members from Uttar Pradesh